This is a list of lakes and ponds in Rhode Island, United States. 
The 237 largest lakes and ponds make up 91% of all inland freshwater area in the state. There are an additional nine large saltwater coastal lagoons along the south coast of Rhode Island.

References

Lakes
Rhode Island